Hongshan District (Mongolian:   , Күн шан тоори, Küŋ šan toɣoriɣ) is a district of the city of Chifeng, Inner Mongolia, People's Republic of China.

References

External links
www.xzqh.org 

County-level divisions of Inner Mongolia
Chifeng